"Round Here" is a song by the Counting Crows.

Round Here may also refer to:
 "Round Here" (Florida Georgia Line song)
 "Round Here" (George Michael song)
 "Round Here" (Memphis Bleek song)
 "'Round Here", a song by Sawyer Brown from This Thing Called Wantin' and Havin' It All